Zorica Dimitrijević-Stošić (3 February 1934, in Smederevo – 13 February 2013, in Belgrade) was a Serbian pianist and accompanist.  She was a professor of piano at the Faculty of Music in Belgrade.

Education
She graduated from the Belgrade Music Academy in 1959, where she also completed her postgraduate studies in Piano Performance in 1963 as a student of Vlastimir Škarka. She also studied in Venice, in the class of prf. Gino Gorny.

Career

Performance career
In addition to her solo performances, Dimitrijević-Stošić has been known for her long-time collaboration with famous European clarinetist Milenko Stefanović. She performed at various music festivals (Dubrovačke letnje igre, Ohridsko leto, BEMUS).

Teaching career
Zorica taught at the Faculty of Music in Belgrade (1954-2001), where she held rank of Full Professor, and served as a Chair of the Piano Department and Associate Dean.

Dimitrijević-Stošić was a member of the Association of Musical Artists of Serbia.

Awards
She was awarded with the October Award of the City of Belgrade (1980), as well as with Great Plaque with Charter of the University of the Arts in Belgrade (1985).

References
Pedeset godina Fakulteta muzičke umetnosti (Muzičke akademije) 1937-1987 (1988), edited by Roksanda Pejović, Univerzitet umetnosti u Beogradu, Beograd
 Sećanje na Zoricu Dimitrijević-Stošić (Serbian)

Academic staff of the University of Arts in Belgrade
Serbian classical pianists
Women classical pianists
University of Arts in Belgrade alumni
Accompanists
2013 deaths
1934 births
Musicians from Smederevo